John Newcombe won in the final 6–3, 7-6 against Arthur Ashe.

Seeds

  John Newcombe (champion)
  Tom Okker (semifinals)
  Ken Rosewall (third round)
  Arthur Ashe (final)
  Stan Smith (semifinals)
  Rod Laver (quarterfinals)
  Manuel Orantes (first round)
  Tom Gorman (first round)

Draw

Finals

Top half

Section 1

Section 2

Bottom half

Section 3

Section 4

References
1974 American Airlines Tennis Games Draw - Men's Singles

1974 American Airlines Tennis Games